Kianjavato is a rural municipality in Madagascar. It belongs to the district of Mananjary, which is a part of Vatovavy. The population of the commune was estimated to be approximately 5,000 in 2001 commune census.

Primary and junior level secondary education are available in town. The majority 99.5% of the population of the commune are farmers.  The most important crops are bananas and rice; also coffee is an important agricultural product. Services provide employment for 0.5% of the population.

Kianjavato is situated alongside the National Road 25 that leads from Fianarantsoa to Mananjary.

References 

Populated places in Vatovavy